Mengeringhausen is a village and a municipal district of Bad Arolsen in Waldeck-Frankenberg, in Hesse, Germany. Its population is estimated to be 3,800  people. 
The was first mentioned as the town 'Stadt Mengeringhausen' in 1234. The town was in possession of sovereign principality Waldeck (later Waldeck and Pyrmont). 

In 1974, Mengeringhausen was incorporated to the city Bad Arolsen.

Notable people 

Mengeringhausen is the birthplace of Conrad Goclenius (1490-1539), Renaissance humanist and friend of Desiderius Erasmus; Philipp Nicolai (1556–1608), Lutheran pastor, poet, and composer; 18th century theologian Ernst Friedrich von Ockel; and the Bavarian Lieutenant General and War Minister Wilhelm von Le Suire (1787–1852). Carl Theodor Severin (1763–1836), also born in Mengeringhausen, was an architect active in Mecklenburg.

References  

Villages in Hesse